Black Aces Football Club commonly knows as Black Aces was a Zimbabwean professional football club based in Harare. It was founded in 1972 and dissolved in 2001.

History
Black Aces was formed from the ashes of Chibuku Shumba in 1977. The team, affectionately named “Shaisa Mufaro” loosely translated to “party-poopers”, is now but distant memory in the minds of football fans.

In the 1990s Black Aces, coached by the Peter Nyama and later on by Swiss national Marc Duvillard, managed to earn a seat among the country’s top clubs.

When Black Aces lost their chief financier, Edgar Ricardo-Serafim, they vowed that they would win the BP League Cup as a fitting tribute to the man who gushed out millions of dollars in support of the club.

https://nehandaradio.com/tag/edgar-ricardo-serafim/

In 1999 Francis “Gaza” Jeyman captained the now struggling side to a famous BP Cup triumph.

Notable players:

During its time in existence, Black Aces produced some of the household names in local football like July Sharara, Archieford Chimutanda, George Rollo, Shadreck Ngwenya, Brenna Msiska, Daniel Chikanda, Bernard Dzingayi, Byron Manuel, Rodrick Muganhiri, Fresh Chamarengah, Percy Mwase, Patrick Daka and David Muchineripi.
The Mugeyi twins Wilfred and William, Stanley Mashezha, Itayi Kapini, Mike Bingandadi, Emmanuel Nyahuma, John Mbidzo, Francis Jayman, Tapuwa Kapini, Tinashe Nengomasha, Nqobizitha Ncube, Wonder Ngoko, Roy Muchuchu, Lewis Chihuri, Knowledge Zinyama, Herbert Zimbeva, Herbert Mbabvu, David Sengu, Tapfumanei Dodo, Timothy Cosmos, Alex Munawa, Vusi Lehar, Tendai Mwarura, George Takaruza and Butler Masango all made their name at Black Aces. It was dissolved in 2001.

Achievements
Zimbabwe Premier Soccer League
Champions (1): 1992
Runners-up: 1980

Zimbabwe Cup
Runners-up: 1980

BP League Cup
Winners (1): 1999

References

External links
Black Aces FC - Team Info - Global Sports Archive

Football clubs in Zimbabwe
Association football clubs established in 1977
Association football clubs disestablished in 2001
Sport in Harare
1977 establishments in Rhodesia
2001 disestablishments in Zimbabwe